{{Infobox surname
| name                = Adair
| pronunciation       = 
| image               = 
| caption             = 
| meaning             = "happy spear" or "ford of the oaks"| region              = England, Scotland, Ulster
| languageorigin      = Gaelic
| variant             = Athdare, Adair, Adare
| family              = 
| footnotes           = Frequency Comparisons
}}

Adair is a surname of Scotland. A common misconception is that the surname is related to Edgar, Eadgar, O'daire or MacDaire. Robert Fitzgerald De Athdare was the first Adair. He was from what is now Limerick, Ireland .

Robert Fitzgerald fought for the honor of family and title against a Gerald, the white knight, a distant cousin. Although Robert Fitzgerald's father was the Earl of Desmond, the Fitzgeralds did not see Robert as a nobleman. It was unacceptable for him to kill a knight. A powerful group was against Robert. Robert became a fugitive, relocating to Wigtownshire in south western Scotland. To cover his tracks, Robert was granted his surname 'Adare' after the town near his father's lands back in Ireland. Upon arriving in Scotland, Robert learned that the King of Scotland had placed a bounty on the head of a man named 'Currie'. Currie was outlawed as a thief and pirate. The King promised Currie's castle, deemed nearly impregnable, to whoever would bring him the head of Currie. Robert Adare watched over Dunskey Castle for several days until Currie came out one evening. Robert followed Currie, and engaged the pirate in mortal combat, slaying him at the head of Colfin Glen. Robert took Currie's severed head to the court of Scotland, which explains the Adair crest of a severed head.

 List of persons with the surname 
 Al Adair (1929–1996), Canadian baseball player, radio broadcaster, author, politician
 Alex Adair (born 1994), British DJ, producer and remixer
 Allan Adair (1897–1988), British army officer, 6th Baronet
 Archibald Adair (died 1647), Irish Anglican bishop
 Barbara Adair, South African author
 Beegie Adair (1937-2022), American jazz pianist
 Belle Adair, American actress
 Benjamin Frank Adair (1852-1902), American politician
 Bethenia Angelina Owens-Adair (1840–1926), American social reformer, physician
 Bill Adair (1913–2002), American baseball player/manager
 Bill Adair (journalist), founder of the PolitiFact website
 Billy Adair, Soccer player in the American Soccer League
 Bonnie Adair (born 1952), American swimmer/coach
 Brian Adair (1935-2021), Scottish sports administrator
 Bunny Adair (1905–1994), Australian politician
 Catherine Steiner-Adair, Psychologist and author
 Cecil Adair, pen name of author Evelyn Everett-Green
 Charles Adair (soccer) (born 1971), American soccer player/coach
 Sir Charles F. Adair Hore (1874–1950), Permanent Secretary of the Ministry of Pensions
 Charles Henry Adair (1851–1920), British admiral
 Charles L. Adair (1902–1993) American admiral
 Charles Wallace Adair (1914-2006), U.S. ambassador
 Sir Charles William Adair (1822–1897), General in the Royal Marines
 Cherry Adair (born 1951), American author
 Christia V. Daniels Adair (1893–1989), African-American suffragist and civil rights worker
 Cornelia Adair (1837–1921), Texas ranch landowner
 Craig Adair (born 1963), New Zealand track cyclist
 Daniel Adair (born 1975), Canadian drummer
 Deb Adair (born 1966), Emmy award-winning sound engineer
 Deborah Adair (born 1952), American actress
 Donald Adair (born 1960), American figure skater
 Doug Adair (1929-2019), U.S. TV news anchor and journalist
 Douglass Adair (1912–1968), American historian
 E. Ross Adair (1907–1983), U.S. Representative from Indiana
 Edward Robert Adair (1888-1965), British and Canadian historian
 Eleanor R. Adair (1926–2013), American scientist
 Forrest Adair (1865–1936), real estate developer
 George Adair (1823–1899), real estate developer
 George W. Adair Jr. (1874–1921), real estate developer
 Gilbert Adair (1944-2011), author and journalist
 Gilbert Smithson Adair (1896–1979), British scientist
 Green B. Adair (1840–1914), cotton merchant
 Harry Adair (born 1997), English cricketer
 Hazel Adair (novelist) (1900-1990), pen name of British author Hazel Iris Addis
 Hazel Adair (1920–2015), British soap opera writer, film producer/director
 Henry R. Adair (1882-1916), American lieutenant cavalry officer
 Hubert Adair (1917–1940), World War II Royal Air Force pilot
 Hugh Edward Adair, 3rd Baronet (1815–1902), British Liberal Party politician
 Hugh R. Adair (1889–1971), Justice of the Montana Supreme Court
 J. Leroy Adair (1887–1956), U.S. Representative from Illinois
 James Adair (historian) (1709–1783), explorer and author
 James Adair (serjeant-at-law) (–1798), Irish soldier, politician
 James Makittrick Adair (1728–1802), Scottish army officer, doctor
 Janet Adair (1901–2005), American Actress
 Janice Adair (1905–1996), British actress
 Jay Adair (born 1969/1970), American businessman, (CEO) of Copart
 Jean Adair (1873–1953), Canadian Actress
 Jerry Adair (1936–1987), American baseball player
 Jessica Adair (born 1986), American basketball player
 Jim Adair (born 1942), Canadian hockey player
 Jimmy Adair (1907–1982), American baseball player, manager and coach
 John Adair (1757–1840), American soldier, politician (Kentucky)
 John Adair (anthropologist) (1913–1997), Professor of Anthropology
 John Adair (author) (born 1934), UK leadership expert
 John Adair (surveyor) (–1722), Scottish surveyor and mapmaker
 John A. M. Adair (1864–1938), U.S. Representative from Indiana
 John Frederick Adair (1852–1913), Irish physicist and cricketer
 John G. Adair, Canadian psychologist
 John George "Black Jack" Adair (1823-1885), Scots-Irish businessman
 John Ronald Shafto Adair (1893–1960), Australian businessman and aviator
 Johnny Adair (born 1963), Ex-Loyalist Paramilitary
 Joseph Adair (1877–1960), Canadian politician
 Mark Adair (born 1996), Irish cricketer
 Mary Adair (born 1936), Cherokee Nation educator and painter
 Molly Adair (1905–1990), British actress
 Nancy Adair, documentary producer
 Natasha Adair (born 1972), women's college basketball coach
 Patrick Adair (1624–1694), Irish presbyterian minister
 Perry Adair (1899–1953), American amateur golfer
 Peter Adair (1943–1996), film-maker and artist
 Red Adair (1915–2004), oil field fire-fighter
 Rhona Adair (1878–1961), British golf champion
 Rick Adair (born 1958), American baseball player, coach
 Robert Adair (actor) (1900–1954), American-born British actor
 Robert Adair (cricketer) (1876–1951), Irish cricketer
 Robert Adair (physicist) (1924–2020), Physics professor
 Robert Adair (politician) (1763–1855), English diplomat
 Robert Adair, 1st Baron Waveney (1811–1886), British politician
 Rod Adair, American politician
 Ron Adair (born 1931), Australian former association footballer
 Ross Adair (born 1994), Irish cricketer
 Sandra Adair (born 1952), American film editor
 Sean Adair (born 1986), South African cricketer
 Thelma C. Davidson Adair (born 1920), Presbyterian educator, guest speaker educator, and activist
 Thomas Benjamin Stratton Adair (1868–1928), Rear Admiral and Scottish politician
 Tom Adair (1913–1988), American songwriter, composer, and screenwriter
 Trevor Adair (–2020), Soccer coach
 Virginia Hamilton Adair (1913–2004), American poet
 William Penn Adair (–1880), second chief of the Cherokee nation, and the person for whom Will Rogers was named
 Sir William Thompson Adair (1850–1931), Royal Marine officer and Ulster Unionist

 Fictional characters 
 Daisy Adair, fictional TV character
 Helen Adair, main character in Comin' Thro the Rye (1923 film) Michael Adair, main character in The Conversations at Curlow Creek''
 Rachel Adair, fictional character on General Hospital
 Adair (Trainz), one of several drivers on Trainz Simulator
 Finnick Odair,  from Suzanne Collins' The Hunger Games trilogy

List of persons with the given name 

 Adair Blain (1894–1983), Australian politician
 Adair Ford Boroughs (born 1979/1980), American lawyer and politician
 Adair Cardoso (born 1993), Brazilian singer and composer
 Adair Crawford (1748–1795), Scots-Irish chemist
 Adair Dyer, Attorney, international law
 Adair Ferguson (born 1955), Australian rower
 Adair Bushyhead "Paddy" Mayes (1885–1963), Major League Baseball player
 Adair Roche, Baron Roche (1871–1956), British judge
 Adair Tishler (born 1996), American child Actress
 Adair Turner, Baron Turner of Ecchinswell (born 1955), British businessman

See also 
 Adair (disambiguation)

References 

Scottish surnames
Surnames of Lowland Scottish origin
Surnames of Ulster-Scottish origin